Impose may refer to:

Horses
Imposing, Australian thoroughbred racehorse
Super Impose (1984-2007), New Zealand thoroughbred racehorse

Other
Righteousness Style Imposing!! Kanetsugu and Keiji, a Japanese seinen manga series
Considerations on the Propriety of Imposing Taxes in the British Colonies, pamphlet by Daniel Dulany the Younger
Operation Imposing Law, a military operation in the Iraq War
Impose, American music magazine

See also
Imposition
Impositions